Chee-Chee or Chee Chee may refer to:

Chee-Chee, a monkey character in the Doctor Dolittle series of children's books
 Chee-Chee, an ethnic slur against an Anglo-Indian or Eurasian half-caste; also a reference to English spoken with a South Asian accent
Chee-Chee and Peppy, an American teen R&B vocal duo in the early 1970s
Frank DeMayo (1885-1949?), Missouri mobster nicknamed "Chee-Chee"
Benjamin Chee Chee (1944-1977), Ojibwa-Canadian artist
Chee-Chee (musical), a 1928 Broadway musical by Richard Rodgers and Lorenz Hart

See also
Chi-Chi (disambiguation)